The Sanctuary of Saint Rose of Lima is a sanctuary dedicated to Saint Rose of Lima (born Isabel Flores de Oliva). It is located in the remains of Oliva's house, including the well used by the family, which serves as a highlight of the convent among visitors.

Because it was the residence of Rose of Lima and her family, it is also the location of the miracles attributed to her.

The sanctuary was inaugurated on August 24, 1992, after being remodeled. It also features a painting of the Saint carried by Miguel Grau among the Huáscar.

See also
Rose of Lima
Historic Centre of Lima
Dominican Order

References

Roman Catholic churches in Lima
Buildings and structures completed in 1728
Rococo architecture